Xavier Crawford (born December 10, 1995) is an American football cornerback for the Seattle Seahawks of the National Football League (NFL). He played college football at Oregon State and Central Michigan.

Professional career

Houston Texans
Crawford was drafted by the Houston Texans in the sixth round (195th overall) of the 2019 NFL Draft. He was waived on October 26, 2019.

Miami Dolphins
On October 28, 2019, Crawford was claimed off waivers by the Miami Dolphins. He was waived on November 30, 2019 and re-signed to the practice squad. He was released on December 5, 2019.

Chicago Bears
On December 9, 2019, Crawford was signed to the Chicago Bears practice squad. On December 30, 2019, Crawford was signed to a reserve/future contract. After being one of the final roster cuts on September 5, 2020, he was signed to the practice squad a day later. He was elevated to the active roster on December 19, December 26, and January 2, 2021, for the team's weeks 15, 16, and 17 games against the Minnesota Vikings, Jacksonville Jaguars, and Green Bay Packers, and reverted to the practice squad after each game. On January 11, 2021, Crawford signed a reserve/futures contract with the Bears. Crawford was placed on injured reserve on December 29, 2021.

Jacksonville Jaguars
On March 24, 2022, Crawford signed with the Jacksonville Jaguars. He was waived on August 30, 2022.

Seattle Seahawks
On September 1, 2022, Crawford was signed to the Seattle Seahawks practice squad. He was promoted to the active roster on September 28. He was released on October 11 and re-signed to the practice squad. He was promoted to the active roster on December 27.

References

1995 births
Living people
People from Pittsburg, California
Players of American football from California
Sportspeople from the San Francisco Bay Area
American football cornerbacks
Oregon State Beavers football players
Central Michigan Chippewas football players
Houston Texans players
Miami Dolphins players
Chicago Bears players
Jacksonville Jaguars players
Seattle Seahawks players